Rong Jing (born 25 November 1988) is a Paralympic fencer from China. She competed in three foil and épée events at the 2016 Paralympics and won a gold medal in each of them. She served as the flag bearer for China at the 2016 Summer Paralympics Parade of Nations. She won the silver medal in the women's épée A event at the 2020 Summer Paralympics held in Tokyo, Japan. She also won two gold medals in the women's team épée and the women's team foil.

References

External links
 

Chinese female épée fencers
Chinese female foil fencers
1988 births
Living people
Wheelchair fencers at the 2016 Summer Paralympics
Wheelchair fencers at the 2020 Summer Paralympics
Paralympic gold medalists for China
Paralympic silver medalists for China
Medalists at the 2016 Summer Paralympics
Medalists at the 2020 Summer Paralympics
Paralympic wheelchair fencers of China
Paralympic medalists in wheelchair fencing
21st-century Chinese women